Ananias Junior Gebhardt (born 8 September 1988) is a Namibian professional footballer who plays as a  left-back for South African Premier Division side Baroka.

References

Living people
1988 births
People from Okahandja
Namibian men's footballers
Namibia international footballers
Association football fullbacks
Ramblers F.C. players
United Africa Tigers players
Black Africa S.C. players
Jomo Cosmos F.C. players
Baroka F.C. players
Namibian expatriate footballers
Expatriate footballers in Macau
Expatriate soccer players in South Africa
Namibian expatriate sportspeople in Macau
Namibian expatriate sportspeople in South Africa
South African Premier Division players